De Smet or Desmet is a Dutch occupational surname. It is a regional form of "the smith" very common in East and West Flanders. It was the tenth most common name in Belgium in 1997. Notable people with the surname include:

Sports 
 Andy De Smet (born 1970), Belgian road cyclist
 Armand Desmet (1931–2012), Belgian cyclist
 , Belgian cyclist
 , Belgian cyclist
 Gilbert Desmet (born 1931), Belgian cyclist
 Gilbert De Smet (1936–1987), Belgian racing cyclist
 Gustaaf De Smet (1935–2020), Belgian cyclist
 Hanne Desmet (born 1996), Belgian short track speed skater
  (born 1989), Belgian athlete
 Jenny De Smet (born 1958), Belgian racing cyclist
 Karel De Smet (born 1980), Belgian footballer
 Lenn De Smet and Liam De Smet (born 2004), Belgian footballers and twin brothers
 Léopold Desmet (born 1935), Belgian gymnast
 Louis Desmet (born 1930), Belgian middle-distance runner
 Luc De Smet (born 1957), Belgian cyclist
 Mathieu De Smet (born 2000), Belgian footballer
 Pieter Desmet (born 1983), Belgian steeplechase and long-distance runner
 Philippe Desmet (born 1958), Belgian football player
 René De Smet (1931–1985), Belgian racing cyclist
 Stijn De Smet (born 1985), Belgian football player
 Théo-Léo De Smet (born 1917), Belgian water polo player
 Thibault De Smet (born 1998), Belgian footballer
 Tom Desmet (born 1969), Belgian cyclist

Arts and other occupations 
 Anne Desmet (born 1964), British artist
  (born 1959), French art historian
  (born 1973), Belgian contemporary dancer
 Dirk De Smet (born 1969), Belgian singer and saxophonist
  (1787–1872), Belgian politician
 Francis De Smet (born 1963), Belgian inventor and film producer
  (born 1977), Belgian journalist and politician
 Gustave De Smet (1877–1943), Belgian painter, brother of Léon De Smet
 Hendrik de Smet (1535–1614), Belgian physician and humanist scholar
 Ingrid De Smet, Belgian-British scholar of Renaissance literature
  (1674–1741), Roman Catholic bishop of Ghent
 Jessy De Smet (born 1976), Belgian singer
 Joseph Jean De Smet (1794–1877), priest and historian who took part in the Belgian Revolution of 1830
  (1881-1966), Belgian painter, brother of Gustave De Smet
  (1892–1973), French architect
  (1898–1982), Belgian politician
  (1912–2006), Belgian poet
  (born 1933), French civil servant and politician
 Paul de Smet de Naeyer (1843–1913), Belgian Catholic Party politician
  (1892–1975), Belgian politician
 Peter de Smet (1944–2003), Dutch comic strip artist
 Pierre-Jean De Smet (1801–1873), Belgian Jesuit priest and missionary in North America
 Pieter De Smet (1503–1571), Flemish humanist scholar and government official in Bruges
 Richard De Smet (1916–1997), Belgian Jesuit Indologist and philosopher
  (1919–2018), French soldier, member of the Free French forces, Companion of the Liberation
 Wim De Smet (1932–2012), Belgian marine zoologist and esperantist
 Wolfgang de Smet (1617–1685), Flemish painter active in Leuven

See also 
 De Smet (disambiguation)

References

Dutch-language surnames
Surnames of Belgian origin